Mont Rougemont (Abenaki: Wigwômedenek) is part of the Monteregian Hills in southern Quebec. It is composed of igneous rock and hornfels. The mountain is mostly covered with sugar maple-dominated forest. Apple orchards and vineyards are cultivated on many of the lower slopes, and much of the fruit is used to make cider.

Geology
The igneous material is composed almost entirely of mafic and ultramafic rock such as gabbro and olivine-bearing pyroxenite. Mont Rougemont might be the deep extension of a vastly eroded ancient volcanic complex, which was probably active about 125 million years ago. The mountain was created when the North American Plate moved westward over the New England hotspot, along with the other mountains of the Monteregian Hills. It forms part of the vast Great Meteor hotspot track.

External links
  Ass. pour la protection et le développement durable du mont Rougemont (APDDMR)
  Nature Action Quebec
  Quebec in photographs Montérégie

References

Mont Rougemont
Mountains of Quebec under 1000 metres
Igneous petrology of Quebec
Stocks (geology)